Charles Shannon West (September 24, 1829 – October 23, 1885) was an American jurist and politician in the state of Texas, serving as a state representative, the Texas Secretary of State, and an Associate Justice of the Texas Supreme Court.

Early life and family

A native of Camden, South Carolina, West was educated at Jefferson College (Pennsylvania) and the College of South Carolina. He read law under the mentorship of James Chesnut, Jr., and was admitted to the bar in 1850.

West's brother was John Camden West, a Waco writer and attorney. His sister Catherine was married to John Alexander Green, an Austin lawyer and politician and brother of Confederate General Tom Green. In 1859, West married Florence Randolph DuVal, daughter of Judge Thomas Howard DuVal and granddaughter of Florida Governor William Pope DuVal. They had three sons, all lawyers, including Judge DuVal West, Woodrow Wilson's personal emissary to Mexico.

Career in Texas

West moved to Texas in 1851. As a lawyer in Austin, West made his first partnership with Henry P. Brewster, thus beginning his successful legal career in that city. In 1855 West was elected to the Texas House of Representatives and served one term. During this tenure he established a partnership with Judge John Hancock; their law firm represented the Houston and Texas Central Railway. West was appointed Secretary of State by Governor Francis R. Lubbock but soon left to fight in the Civil War, on the side of the C.S.A. West achieved the rank of major and was Judge Advocate General for the Trans-Mississippi Department. After the war he resumed his practice with Hancock. In the 1870s he worked as one of the six establishing directors of the Agricultural and Mechanical College of Texas, and was a delegate to the Texas Constitutional Convention in 1875. He was appointed to the Supreme Court of Texas in December 1882 and resigned in September 1885. He died in Austin and is buried in Oakwood Cemetery.

References

Swift, Roy L. Civilizers: The DuVals of Texas. Austin, Texas: Eakin Press, 1992.

External links

1829 births
1885 deaths
Members of the Texas House of Representatives
Secretaries of State of Texas
People from Austin, Texas
People from Camden, South Carolina
Texas state court judges
Texas lawyers
Justices of the Texas Supreme Court
Washington & Jefferson College alumni
University of South Carolina alumni
Burials at Oakwood Cemetery (Austin, Texas)
U.S. state supreme court judges admitted to the practice of law by reading law
19th-century American politicians
19th-century American judges
19th-century American lawyers